Henk Muller  (24 October 1887 – 7 May 1940) was a Dutch footballer. He was part of the Netherlands national football team, playing 2 matches and scoring 1 goal. He played his first match on 29 April 1906.

See also
 List of Dutch international footballers

References

Genealogy

1887 births
1940 deaths
Dutch footballers
Netherlands international footballers
Footballers from Utrecht (city)
Association footballers not categorized by position